The Eastern Association was a minor league baseball league. The first version of the league appeared in 1882, followed by similar one season leagues in 1891 and 1909 with teams in Connecticut, New York, Pennsylvania and Rhode Island. The league was a Class B level league in the 1913 and 1914 seasons, with teams based in Connecticut and Massachusetts.

History

The 1891 Eastern Association played as a Class A level league and the president was Charles D. White. the 1891 league members were the Albany Senators, Buffalo Bisons, Lebanon Cedars, New Haven Nutmegs, Providence Clamdiggers, Rochester Hop Bitters, Syracuse Stars and Troy Trojans.

In 1909, the Eastern Association played for eleven days before folding under league president Jim Paige. The 1909 league comprised Amsterdam, Gloversville, Johnstown, Kingston Colonials, Middletown Orange Blossoms, Newburgh Colts, Poughkeepsie Students and Schenectady.

The 1913 Eastern Association was an eight-team league that featured the Bridgeport Crossmen, Hartford Senators, Holyoke Papermakers, Meriden Hopes, New Haven White Wings, New London Planters, Pittsfield Electrics, Springfield Ponies and Waterbury Contenders. The league president was Baseball Hall of Fame member Jim O'Rourke. The Holyoke Papermakers moved to Meriden on July 11, 1913.

In their final season of play, the 1914 Eastern Association was an eight-team league, as Jim O'Rourke continued as president. The 1914 Eastern Association comprised the Bridgeport Crossmen, Hartford Senators, New Britain Sinks, New Haven White Wings, New London Planters, Pittsfield Electrics, Springfield Ponies and Waterbury Contenders.

Cities represented
Albany, New York: Albany Senators 1891 
Amsterdam, New York: Amsterdam 1909
Bridgeport, Connecticut: Bridgeport Crossmen 1913; Bridgeport Bolts 1914
Buffalo, New York: Buffalo Bisons 1891 
Gloversville, New York: Gloversville 1909
Hartford, Connecticut: Hartford Senators 1913–1914
Holyoke, Massachusetts: Holyoke Papermakers 1913
Johnstown, New York: Johnstown 1909
Kingston, New York: Kingston Colonials 1909
Lebanon, Pennsylvania: Lebanon Cedars 1891 
Meriden, Connecticut: Meriden Hopes 1913
Middletown, New York: Middletown Orange Blossoms 1909
New Britain, Connecticut: New Britain Sinks 1914
 New Haven, Connecticut: New Haven Nutmegs 1891; New Haven White Wings 1913–1914
New London, Connecticut: New London Planters 1913–1914
Newburgh, New York: Newburgh Colts 1909
Pittsfield, Massachusetts: Pittsfield Electrics 1913–1914
Poughkeepsie, New York: Poughkeepsie Students 1909
Providence, Rhode Island: Providence Clamdiggers 1891 
Rochester, New York: Rochester Hop Bitters 1891 
Schenectady, New York: Schenectady 1909
Springfield, Massachusetts: Springfield Ponies 1913–1914
Syracuse, New York: Syracuse Stars 1891 
Troy, New York: Troy Trojans 1891
Waterbury, Connecticut: Waterbury Contenders 1913; Waterbury Frolickers 1914

Standings & statistics

1891 Eastern Association
schedule
 Providence disbanded August 13; New Haven disbanded August 14; Syracuse & Rochester disbanded August 25.

1909 Eastern Association
 Poughkeepsie and Schenectady disbanded June 1The league folded after eleven days.

1913 Eastern Association
schedule
 Holyoke (24–52) moved to Meriden July 11.

1914 Eastern Association
schedule

References

Sources
Baseball Reference

1913 establishments in Connecticut
1914 disestablishments in Connecticut
Defunct minor baseball leagues in the United States
Baseball leagues in Connecticut
Baseball leagues in Massachusetts
Baseball leagues in New York (state)
Baseball leagues in Pennsylvania
Baseball leagues in Rhode Island
Sports leagues established in 1913
Sports leagues disestablished in 1914